Sir Henricus Wilhelmus van der Heyden  (born 1957) is a New Zealand dairy farmer, business executive and company director. He was chair of Fonterra from 2002 to 2012.

In the 2007 Queen's Birthday Honours, van der Heyden was appointed a Distinguished Companion of the New Zealand Order of Merit, for services to agriculture. In 2009, following the restoration of titular honours by the New Zealand government, he accepted redesignation as a Knight Companion of the New Zealand Order of Merit. In 2011, he was conferred with an honorary Doctor of Commerce degree by Lincoln University.

References

1957 births
Living people
Knights Companion of the New Zealand Order of Merit
New Zealand businesspeople
Businesspeople awarded knighthoods